The Book of Mormon is a sacred text of The Church of Jesus Christ of Latter-day Saints.

It may also refer to:
Book of Mormon (Mormon's record), the name of a book, or division, in the larger Book of Mormon
 The Words of Mormon, also in the Book of Mormon, and referred to as the "First Book of Mormon" in some editions.
The Book of Mormon (musical), a Broadway musical by Trey Parker, Robert Lopez, and Matt Stone
The Book of Mormon Movie, a 2003 drama film based on the religious texts